Andy Childs (born December 7, 1962) is an American country music singer-songwriter. In 1993, Childs released one studio album for RCA, which produced three singles on the Billboard Hot Country Singles & Tracks chart. His highest charting single, "Simple Life," peaked at No. 61 in 1994.

Childs has been a member of the country quintet Sixwire since its foundation in 2002. Sixwire recorded one studio album for Warner Bros. Records and charted two more singles on the country charts.  Sixwire was featured as a finalist on American Idol's The Next Great American Band which aired on FOX in 2007.  The band placed second out of the twelve finalists.  Sixwire now serves as house band on CMT's Next Superstar.

As a songwriter, Childs penned more than half of the songs on Sixwire's Warner Brothers album, and has had songs recorded by Country artists Chris Cagle, George Canyon and others.

Discography

Albums

Singles

Music videos

References

External links
[ ((( Andy Childs > Overview )))]

1962 births
American country pianists
American male pianists
American country singer-songwriters
American male singer-songwriters
Living people
Musicians from Memphis, Tennessee
RCA Records artists
Singer-songwriters from Tennessee
20th-century American pianists
Country musicians from Tennessee
21st-century American pianists
20th-century American male musicians
21st-century American male musicians